Santa Cruz do Arari is a Brazilian municipality located in the state of Pará. Its population as of 2020 is estimated to be 10,314 people. The area of the municipality is 1,074.854 km². The city belongs to the mesoregion Marajó and the microregion of Arari.

In 2010, the mayor was Marcelo José Pamplona Beltrão. The United Nations HDI, or Human Development Index, score for Santa Cruz do Arari is 0.63.

Nearby Lake Arari is a large lake located on the island Marajó, which is a tourist attraction and the home of a wide variety of avian life.
The municipality is contained in the  Marajó Archipelago Environmental Protection Area, a sustainable-use conservation unit established in 1989 to protect the environment of the delta region.

References

Municipalities in Pará